Oleksandr Peklushenko (August 29, 1954, Zaporizhzhia – March 12, 2015, Soniachne, Zaporizhzhia Raion) was a Ukrainian politician and public figure, member of the Verkhovna Rada of IV, V, VI convocation, chairman of Zaporizhzhia Regional State Administration in 2011–2014 and member of the Political Council of the Party of Regions.

On March 12, 2015 he was found dead in his house in the village of Sonyachne, near Zaporizhzhia. He had suffered a gunshot wound to the neck and authorities said initial inquiries pointed to suicide, but other theories were being investigated including murder. Five other former officials serving former Ukrainian President (until the 2014 Ukrainian Revolution) Viktor Yanukovych also died in mysterious circumstances in the 6 weeks before his death.

In 2003 he received Honorary Diploma of the Cabinet of Ministers of Ukraine.

See also
 Mykhailo Chechetov

References

External links
 Oleksandr Peklushenko' profile at Verkhovna Rada of Ukraine official web-site

1954 births
2015 suicides
Burials at Baikove Cemetery
Communist Party of Ukraine (Soviet Union) politicians
Governors of Zaporizhzhia Oblast
Fourth convocation members of the Verkhovna Rada
Fifth convocation members of the Verkhovna Rada
Sixth convocation members of the Verkhovna Rada
Liberal Party of Ukraine politicians
Party of Regions politicians
Politicians from Zaporizhzhia
Suicides by firearm in Ukraine
Ukrainian politicians who committed suicide
Laureates of the Honorary Diploma of the Verkhovna Rada of Ukraine
Recipients of the Honorary Diploma of the Cabinet of Ministers of Ukraine